Geertruida "Ruud" Maria Geels (born 28 July 1948) is a Dutch former professional footballer who played as a striker and attacking midfielder. He obtained 20 caps for the Netherlands national team, scoring eleven goals, in the 1970s.

Career statistics

Club

International

Honours

Club 
Feyenoord
 Eredivisie: 1968–69
 KNVB Cup: 1968–69
 European Cup: 1969–70

Club Brugge
 Belgian First Division: 1972–73

Ajax
 Eredivisie: 1976–77

RSC Anderlecht
 UEFA Super Cup: 1978
Belgian Sports Merit Award: 1978

Individual 
 Eredivisie Top Scorer: 1974–75, 1975–76, 1976–77, 1977–78, 1980–81
 UEFA Cup Top Scorer: 1975–76
 World XI: 1976

References

External links 

 Profile 
 

1948 births
Living people
Dutch footballers
Dutch expatriate footballers
Association football forwards
Association football midfielders
AFC Ajax players
Feyenoord players
PSV Eindhoven players
Go Ahead Eagles players
Sparta Rotterdam players
Club Brugge KV players
NAC Breda players
SC Telstar players
R.S.C. Anderlecht players
Footballers from Haarlem
1974 FIFA World Cup players
UEFA Euro 1976 players
Netherlands international footballers
Eredivisie players
Belgian Pro League players
Expatriate footballers in Belgium
Dutch expatriate sportspeople in Belgium